Pamela Tshwete (born 3 October 1961) is a politician, member of the African National Congress and current the Deputy Minister of Water and Sanitation in South Africa. She is a widow of Steve Tshwete.

She was first elected in 2002.

See also
African Commission on Human and Peoples' Rights
Constitution of South Africa
History of the African National Congress
Politics in South Africa
Provincial governments of South Africa

References

External links 

 Government biography

Living people
21st-century South African politicians
Members of the National Assembly of South Africa
Women members of the National Assembly of South Africa
21st-century South African women politicians
1951 births